The Convention for the Protection of Submarine Telegraph Cables is a multilateral treaty that was signed in 1884 in order to protect submarine communications cables that had begun to be laid in the 19th century.

Content
The convention made it a punishable offence to damage submarine communications cables. Any ship that accidentally hooked a cable and sacrificed its fishing nets to avoid breaking it would be compensated for the lost equipment.

State parties
The convention has been signed, ratified, and acceded to by the following parties. A number of dependent territories ratified the convention or had the convention extended to them. 

For states that were not original signatories, the date they accepted the convention is indicated.

Notes

Telecommunications treaties
Law of the sea treaties
Convention
Treaties entered into force in 1888
Treaties concluded in 1884
Convention
Treaties of Algeria
Treaties of Argentina
Treaties of Austria-Hungary
Treaties of the First Austrian Republic
Treaties of Belgium
Treaties of the Empire of Brazil
Treaties extended to Canada
Treaties of the Cape Colony
Treaties of Costa Rica
Treaties of Czechoslovakia
Treaties of the Free City of Danzig
Treaties of Denmark
Treaties of the Dominican Republic
Treaties of El Salvador
Treaties of Fiji
Treaties of the French Third Republic
Treaties of the German Empire
Treaties of the Kingdom of Greece
Treaties of Guatemala
Treaties of the Kingdom of Hungary (1920–1946)
Treaties of the Kingdom of Italy (1861–1946)
Treaties of the Empire of Japan
Treaties of Luxembourg
Treaties of Malta
Treaties of the Colony of Natal
Treaties of the Netherlands
Treaties extended to the Dominion of Newfoundland
Treaties of the Colony of New South Wales
Treaties of the Colony of New Zealand
Treaties of Norway
Treaties of the Ottoman Empire
Treaties of the Second Polish Republic
Treaties of the Kingdom of Portugal
Treaties of the Colony of Queensland
Treaties of the Kingdom of Romania
Treaties of the Russian Empire
Treaties of the Kingdom of Serbia
Treaties of the Colony of South Australia
Treaties of Spain under the Restoration
Treaties of the Colony of Tasmania
Treaties of Tunisia
Treaties of the United Kingdoms of Sweden and Norway
Treaties of the United Kingdom (1801–1922)
Treaties of the United States
Treaties of Uruguay
Treaties of the Colony of Victoria
Treaties of the Colony of Western Australia
1884 in France
Treaties extended to Curaçao and Dependencies
Treaties extended to the Faroe Islands
Treaties extended to Greenland